Matiar Rahman Chowdhury Bangladesh Nationalist Party politician. He was elected a member of parliament for Rangpur-12 in the 1979 Bangladeshi general election.

Career 
Matiar Rahman Chowdhury was elected a member of parliament for constituency Rangpur-12 as a Bangladesh Nationalist Party candidate in the 1979 Bangladeshi general election.

References 

Living people
Year of birth missing (living people)
Bangladesh Nationalist Party politicians
2nd Jatiya Sangsad members